The 12th Bangladesh National Film Awards was presented by the Ministry of Information, Bangladesh to felicitate the best of Bangladeshi cinema released in the year 1987. The ceremony took place in Dhaka and awards were given by the then president of Bangladesh. The National Film Awards are the only film awards given by the government itself. Every year, a national panel appointed by the government selects the winning entry, and the award ceremony is held in Dhaka. 1987 was the 12th National Film Awards.

List of winners
This year awards were given in 17 categories. Awards for Best Lyricist was not given in 1987.

Merit awards

Technical awards

See also
Meril Prothom Alo Awards
Ifad Film Club Award
Babisas Award

References

External links

National Film Awards (Bangladesh) ceremonies
1987 film awards
1989 awards in Bangladesh
1989 in Dhaka
February 1989 events in Bangladesh